Air Marshal Robert Timothy Chipman,  is a senior officer in the Royal Australian Air Force (RAAF) who serves as Chief of Air Force since July 2022. He joined the RAAF as an aeronautical engineer in 1989 and gained his pilot's wings in 1994. He has commanded No. 75 Squadron RAAF (2006–09), the Air and Space Operations Centre (2010–12), No. 81 Wing RAAF (2013–14) and Air Task Unit 630.1 (2014), and deployed to the Middle East on Operations Slipper and Okra. He served as the Australian Military Representative to NATO and the European Union from 2019 to 2021 and Head Military Strategic Commitments from 2021 to 2022. He succeeded Air Marshal Mel Hupfeld as Chief of Air Force on 1 July 2022.

RAAF career
Chipman joined the Royal Australian Air Force (RAAF) as an officer cadet in 1989. He graduated from the University of Sydney with a Bachelor of Aeronautical Engineering with Honours in 1992 and gained his pilot's wings in 1994. His early career included postings to Nos. 25 and 76 Squadrons, flying the Macchi MB-326H, and later Nos. 77 and 75 Squadrons after converting to the McDonnell Douglas F/A-18 Hornet. On qualifying as a fighter combat instructor in 1999, he was posted to No. 2 Operational Conversion Unit as an instructor on the F/A-18 Hornet and then as a fighter combat instructor and flight commander in No. 75 Squadron.

Chipman was appointed executive officer of No. 2 Operational Conversion Unit in 2002, Deputy Director Firepower in the Capability Development Group in 2004, and commanding officer of No. 75 Squadron in 2006. During Chipman's command, No. 75 Squadron was awarded the Gloucester Cup as the most proficient flying squadron in the RAAF in 2008 and the Kittyhawk Trophy as the most proficient fighter squadron in 2009. On promotion to group captain in 2010, Chipman was made Director of the Air and Space Operations Centre in Headquarters Joint Operations Command. In 2012, he deployed to Qatar in support of Operation Slipper, serving as a battle director in the United States 609th Air and Space Operations Center. Following his return to Australia, he was appointed commanding officer of No. 81 Wing at RAAF Base Williamtown.

Chipman redeployed to the Middle East in September 2014, this time as commander of Air Task Unit 630.1 on Operation Okra. He returned to Australia in 2015 as the inaugural Director of Plan Jericho. Plan Jericho was a "transformation program intended to deliver joint, integrated air and space capability" for the Australian Defence Force (ADF). The following year, in recognition of his "outstanding achievement" in the Middle East, Chipman was awarded a Conspicuous Service Cross in the 2016 Australia Day Honours. He completed the Defence and Strategic Studies Course later that year, graduating with a Master of Business Administration.

Chipman subsequently served as Director General Capability Planning – Air Force and, on promotion to air vice-marshal, was posted to Belgium in 2019 as Australian Military Representative to NATO and the European Union. In the Queen's Birthday Honours that year, he was appointed a Member of the Order of Australia for his "exceptional service ... in coalition air operations, air combat capability preparedness, and strategic capability development and sustainment." Chipman returned to Australia in 2021 as Head Military Strategic Commitments, with responsibility for the strategic management and situational awareness of ADF commitments.

In June 2022, the Deputy Prime Minister and Minister for Defence, Richard Marles, announced that Chipman would be appointed as the next Chief of Air Force. Chipman succeeded Air Marshal Mel Hupfeld in the role on 1 July.

Personal life
Chipman is married to Alyce and has four children. His father, Doug Chipman, is a retired RAAF air commodore and the mayor of the City of Clarence in Tasmania.

References

|-

Australian aviators
Australian military personnel of the War in Afghanistan (2001–2021)
Living people
Members of the Order of Australia
Recipients of the Conspicuous Service Cross (Australia)
Royal Australian Air Force air marshals
University of Sydney alumni
Year of birth missing (living people)